Setf or SETF may refer to:

 Social Exclusion Task Force
 Sociedad Explotadora de Tierra del Fuego, a former sheep-farming company.
 Southeast Toyota Finance, a division of JM Family Enterprises
 State Employees and Teachers Federation
 setf, a special form in Common Lisp and Lisp that uses its first argument to define a place in memory then evaluates its second argument and stores the returned value at the memory location
 Submarine escape training facility
 Submarine Escape Training Facility (Australia)
 Syrian Emergency Task Force